Neat Records was a British independent record label based near Newcastle, England. The label was established in 1979 by David Wood, who was the owner of Impulse Studios in Wallsend, Tyne and Wear, England. A key figure in the establishment of the label was Steve Thompson. Thompson was house producer at Impulse at the time and helped set up Neat, became the A&R manager and produced all the initial recordings, as well as managing the publishing arm, Neat Music. The label was sold in 1995 to Sanctuary Records.

Neat Records was arguably the most instrumental label in the revival of heavy metal in the early 1980s in the UK. The movement was known as the new wave of British heavy metal or NWOBHM for short. The label is most notable for the early releases of Newcastle band Venom who are widely credited with the invention of black metal. While none of Neat Records' acts really broke through to the mainstream themselves, Venom, Raven, Blitzkrieg and Jaguar particularly are acknowledged as major influences on a host of major American thrash metal bands such as Metallica, Megadeth and Anthrax. Metallica have covered Blitzkrieg's self-titled song "Blitzkrieg" and Metallica drummer Lars Ulrich has claimed "Whiplash" to be a deliberate attempt to emulate Jaguar's song "Stormchild" which was written by Jeff Cox. This was disclosed to interviewer Robin Askew from 'Venue' magazine during an interview with Lars Ulrich, and subsequently published in the magazine.

Other notable acts to release music through Neat Records include Warfare, White Spirit (notable as the then band of current Iron Maiden guitarist Janick Gers) and Persian Risk (notable as the original band of Motörhead guitarist Phil Campbell).

Discography
Singles
 01 Motorway - "All I Wanna Be Is Your Romeo"  7" (ST)
 02 Janie McKenzie - "One and Only Girl"  7"  (ST)
 03 Tygers of Pan Tang - "Don't Touch Me There / Burnin' Up / Bad Times"  7" (ST)
 04 Fist - "Name, Rank And Serial Number / You'll Never Get Me in One of Those"  7" (ST)
 05 White Spirit - "Back to The Grind / Cheetah"  7" (KN)
 06 Raven - "Don't Need Your Money / Wiped Out"  7" (ST)
 07 Aragorn - "Black Ice"  7" (KN)
 08 Venom - "In League with Satan / Live Like an Angel, Die Like a Devil"  7"  (ST)
 09 Bitches Sin - "Always Ready for Love / Sign of the Times"  7" (KN)
 10 Blitzkrieg - "Buried Alive / Blitzkrieg"  7" (KN)
 11 Raven - "Hard Ride / Crazy World"  7"  (ST)
 12 Raw Deal - "Lonewolf / Take the Sky"  7" (KN)
 13 Venom - "Bloodlust / In Nomine Satanas"  7" (KN)
 14 Steel - "Rock Out / All Systems Go"  7" (KN)
 15 Raven - "Crash, Bang, Wallop / Rock Hard"  7" (KN)
 15-12 Raven - "Crash, Bang, Wallop"  12" (4 track EP)(KN)
 16 Jaguar - "Axe Crazy / War Machine"  7" (KN)
 17 Heavy Pettin' - "Roll the Dice / Love Times Love"  7" (KN)
 18 Dedringer - "Hot Lady / Hot Licks And Rock 'n' Roll"  7" (KN)
 19 Crucifixion - "Take It or Leave It / On the Run"  7" (KN)
 20 Warrior - "Dead When It Comes to Love / Kansas City / Stab in the Back"  7" (KN)
 21 Fist - "The Wanderer / Too Hot"  7" (KN)
 22 Valhalla - "Comin' Home"  7" (KN)
 23 Sabre - "Miracle Man / On the Loose"  7" (KN)
 24 Persian Risk - "Ridin' High / Hurt You"  7" (KN)
 25-12 Various - One Take No Dubs  12" (4 track EP, Black Rose, Hellanbach, Alien, Avenger) (KN)
 26 Jess Cox - "Bridges"  7" (KN)
 27 Venom - "Die Hard / Acid Queen"  7" (KN)
 27-12 Venom - "Die Hard / Acid Queen / Bursting Out"  12" (KN)
 28 Raven - "Break the Chain / Ballad of Marshall Stack"  7" (KN)
 29 Raven - "Born to Be Wild / Inquisitor"  7" (KN)
 29P Raven - "Born to Be Wild / Inquisitor"  7" (KN)
 29-12 Raven - "Born to Be Wild / Inquisitor / Break the Chain"  12" (KN)
 30 Saracen - "We Have Arrived / Face in the Crowd"  7" (KN)
 31 Avenger - "Too Wild to Tame / On the Rocks"  7" (KN)
 32 Tobruk - "Wild on the Run / The Show Must Go On"  7" (KN)
 33 Tysondog - "Eat the Rich / Dead Meat"  7" (KN)
 34 Emerson - "Something Special"  7" (KN)
 35 Jess Cox - "One in a Million"  7" (KN)
 36 Valhalla - "Still in Love with You"  7" (KN)
 37 Crucifixion - "Green Eyes / Moon Rising / Jailbait"  7" (KN)
 37-12 Crucifixion - "Green Eyes / Moon Rising / Jailbait"  12" (KN)
 38 Venom - "Warhead / Lady Lust"  7"     (With 3 different sleeves)(KN)
 38P Venom - "Warhead / Lady Lust"  7" (Mauve vinyl)(KN)
 38-12 Venom - "Warhead / Lady Lust / 7 Gates of Hell"  7" (KN)
 38P-12 Venom - "Warhead / Lady Lust / 7 Gates of Hell"  12" (KN)
 39 TNT - "Back on the Road / Rockin' the Night"  7" (KN)
 40 Glasgow - "Stranded / Heat of the Night"  7" (KN)
 41 Warfare - "Noise, Filth and Fury"  7" (KN)
 42 Mammath - "Rock Me / Rough 'n' Ready"  7" (KN)
 43 Venom - "Manitou / Woman"  7" (KN)
 43P Venom - "Manitou / Woman"  7" (KN)
 43-12 Venom - "Manitou / Woman / Dead of the Night"  12" (KN)
 SHAPE 43 Venom - "Manitou / Woman"  7" (KN)
 43SC Venom - "Manitou" Cassette Single (KN)
 44-12* Lone Wolf - "Nobody's Move / Town to Town / Leave Me Behind"  12" (KN)
 45-12* Warfare - "Two Tribes / Hell / Blown to Bits"  12" (KN)
 46 Tysondog - "Shoot to Kill / Hammerhead"  7"  (KN)
 46-12 Tysondog - "Shoot to Kill / Hammerhead / Changling / Back to the Bullet!  12" (KN)
 47 Venom - "Nightmare / Satanachist"  7" (KN)
 47S Venom - "Nightmare / Satanachist"  7" (KN)
 47-12 Venom - "Nightmare / Satanachist / FOAD / Warhead (live)"  12" (2 different sleeves)(KN)
 47-12SP Venom - "Nightmare / Satanachist / FOAD / Warhead (live)"  12" (KN)
 47SC Venom - "Nightmare"  Cassette Single (6 track cassette)(KN)
 48-12 Black Rose - "Nightmare / Need a Lot of Lovin' / Rock Me Hard / Breakaway"  12" (KN)
 49-12 Warfare - Total Death EP  12" (4 track EP)(KN)
 50 She - "Never Surrender / Breaking Away"  7" (KN)
 50-12 She - "Never Surrender / Breaking Away / On My Way"  12" (KN)
 52 State Trooper - "She Got the Look"  7" (KN)
 52-12 State Trooper - "She Got the Look"  12" (KN)
 53-12 Venom - Hell At Hammersmith EP  12" (3 track live EP, limited to 10,000)(KN)
 55-12 Atomkraft - "Queen of Death"  12"  (KN)
 56 Tysondog - "School's Out / Don't Let the Bastards Grind You Down"  7" (KN)
 56-12 Tysondog - School's Out / Don't Let The Bastards Grind You Down /Back to the Bullet 12" (KN)
 57 Shotgun Brides - "Restless"  7" (KN)
 58 Warfare - "Addicted to Love"  7"  (KN) (White label only never released)
 60-12 Mantas - "Deceiver"  12" (KN)
 63 Carl & the Passion - "Everybody Walks Too Fast/How Do You Get Home" 7"
 ISAX1047 Axis - "Lady"  7" (released on Metal Minded label) (KN)
 MM2 Badge - "Silver Woman"  7" (released on Metal Minded label)

Albums

 1000 Various - Lead Weight   LP  (KN)
 1001 Raven - Rock Until You Drop   LP
 1001P Raven - Rock Until You Drop   LP
 1002 Venom - Welcome To Hell   LP (KN)
 1002P Venom - Welcome To Hell   LP (KN)
 1003 Fist - Back with a Vengeance   LP (KN)
 1004 Raven - Wiped Out   LP (KN)
 1005 Venom - Black Metal   LP (KN)
 1005P Venom - Black Metal   LP (KN)
 1006 Hellanbach - Now Hear This   LP  (KN)
 1007 Jaguar - Power Games   LP  (KN)
 1008 Geordie - No Sweat   LP  (KN)
 1009 Dedringer - Second Rising   LP (KN)
 1010 Jess Cox - Third Step   LP   (KN)
 1011 Raven - All for One  LP
 1012 Satan - Court in the Act   LP  (KN)
 1013 Cloven Hoof - Cloven Hoof   LP (KN)
 1014 Various - Metal Battle   LP  (KN)
 1015 Venom - At War with Satan   LP (KN)
 1015P Venom - At War with Satan   LP (KN)
 1016 Saracen - Change of Heart   LP  (KN)
 1017 Tysondog - Beware of the Dog   LP (KN)
 1018 Avenger - Blood Sports   LP (KN)
 1019 Hellanbach - The Big H   LP  (KN)
 1020 Raven - Live at the Inferno   LP
 1021 Warfare - Pure Filth   LP  (KN)
 1022 Phasslayne - Cut It Up   LP  (KN)
 1023 Blitzkrieg - A Time of Changes   LP (KN)
 1024 Venom - Possessed   LP (KN)
 1024P Venom - Possessed   LP (KN)
 1025 Axewitch - Visions of the Past   LP  (KN)
 1026 Avenger - Killer Elite   LP  (KN)
 1027 Wishbone Ash - Raw to the Bone   LP
 1027P Wishbone Ash - Raw to the Bone   LP
 1028 Atomkraft - Future Warriors   LP  (KN)
 1029 Warfare - Metal Anarchy   LP  (KN)
 1030 Artillery - Fear of Tomorrow   LP
 1031 Tysondog - Crimes of Insanity   LP  (KN)
 1032 Venom - Eine Kleine Nachtmusik  LP  (KN)
 1033 Various - Powertrax   LP  (KN)
 1034 Black Rose - Walk It How You Talk It   LP (KN)
 1035 Deaf Dealer - Keeper of the Flame   LP (KN)
 1036 War Machine - Unknown Soldier   LP  (KN)
 1037 Tygers of Pan Tang - First Kill   LP  (KN)
 1038 Artillery - Terror Squad   LP
 1039 Peer Gunt - Back Seat   LP
 1040 Warfare - Mayhem, Fuckin' Mayhem   LP (KN)
 1041 Atomkraft - Conductors of Noise   LP  (KN)
 1042 Mantas - Winds of Change   LP  (KN)
 1043 Slutt - Model Youth   LP
 1044 Warfare - Conflict of Hatred   LP  (KN)
 1045 Shotgun Brides - Nothin' Ventured   LP (KN)
 1046 Artillery - Artillery 3   LP
 1047 Decimator - Carnage City State Mosh Patrol   LP  (KN)
 1048 Cronos - Dancing in the Fire   LP  (KN)
 1049 Cockney Rejects - Lethal   LP
 D1051 Cronos - Rock 'n' Roll Disease   CD (KN)
 D1052 Decimator - Dirty, Hot and Hungry   CD (KN)

Compilations
There have been a number of complications released which feature tracks exclusively from the Neat Records catalogue.
 The Neat Singles Collection Vol. 1
 The Neat Singles Collection Vol. 2
 The Neat Singles Collection Vol. 3
 The Flame Burns On: The Best of Neat Records

See also
 List of record labels
 Venom (band)
 NWOBHM

References

British independent record labels
Heavy metal record labels
Record labels established in 1979
Black metal record labels